Winstanley College is a sixth-form college in the Billinge Higher End area of the Metropolitan Borough of Wigan, Greater Manchester.

Admissions
In the academic year 2022-23 it had approx 2300 full-time students. The catchment area spreads across several areas of the North West of England, incorporating much of Wigan, Bolton, Preston, Salford, West Lancashire, Chorley, Warrington, St. Helens, Sefton and Knowsley.

Buildings
The college has undergone a major re-development; including the building of a part student-designed extension to the Science block and an extension to the Social Sciences block to extend the classrooms and accommodate the new Criminology qualification.

Student Union and Societies

Winstanley College Students' Union is an independent union and a member of the National Union of Students. The student union is run by the Student Union Executive, which contains eight officers. Usually, each officer is a second-year student, elected by Lower Sixth students, going into the Upper Sixth year. The college also accommodates a BAME society, LGBTQ society and has students sat on the Equality and Diversity group.

History

Grammar school
The college began life as Upholland Grammar School, which was founded in 1661. The grammar school moved to its present site on Winstanley Road in Billinge Higher End in September 1953. It had 600 boys and girls in the 1960s and had 750 by 1976.
During World War II the grammar school had its own Air Cadet Squadron – 1439 (Beacon) squadron with the headmaster Alfred Maggs BA MSc as the first commanding officer (Flt Lt A. Maggs RAFVR(T)).

Sixth form college

It was renamed Winstanley College in August 1977, and at that time, it ceased to enrol new pupils at age 11, gradually becoming a sixth form college. By September 1981, no pupils remained in the lower forms, and the transformation to a sixth-form college was complete. In early 2009, plans were unveiled for an extensive redevelopment of the grounds, which was subsequently put to the Learning & Skills Council for approval.  In mid-2009 the project was shelved for lack of grant funding.
Since that time the college has redeveloped the 1950s buildings by replacing its flat roofs, the music block was replaced with a £3m building for media and performing arts which was completed in 2012. A replacement library block and new accommodation for physical sciences and biology were completed in 2014. In March 2019, a new social sciences building was opened, home to sociology, psychology, health and social care and in 2019/20 to the new criminology A level.

Notable alumni
 Richard Ashcroft, Pete Salisbury, Simon Jones & Nick McCabe- from the band The Verve.
 Sara Bayman – Netball player for England; bronze medallist at the 2010 Commonwealth Games.
 Shaun Briscoe – rugby league footballer for Hull Kingston Rovers formerly of Wigan Warriors and Hull
 Sam Darbyshire – Hollyoaks Jamie "Fletch" Fletcher
 Helen Don-Duncan, backstroke swimmer in the 200m event at the 2000 Olympics
 Roger Draper, Chief Executive since 2006 of the Lawn Tennis Association
 Matthew McNulty – The Terror, Lt Little
 Ibinabo Jack, Vera DC Jacqueline Williams 
 Lucy Gaskell – Casualty Kirsty Clements
 David Grindley – British 400 metre runner. Bronze medallist at the 1992 Barcelona Olympic Games
 Leah Hackett – Hollyoaks Tina McQueen
 Nisha Katona – chef
 Adam McClean – BBC Breakfast and BBC News journalist (founded college TV station Winstanley TV)
 Leon Osman – professional footballer for Everton FC
 Carley Stenson – Hollyoaks Steph Dean, Shrek the Musical Princess Fiona, Legally Blonde (musical) Elle Woods, Les Miserables (musical) Fantine
 Davinia Taylor (née Murphy), actress
 Georgia Taylor – Coronation Street Toyah Battersby, Casualty Ruth Winters
 Nicholas Woods – first-class cricketer
Ethan Havard – Wigan Warriors

Upholland Grammar School

 Catherine Ashton, Baroness Ashton of Upholland – High Representative of the European Union for Foreign Affairs and Security Policy, former Leader of the House of Lords and European Commissioner for Trade
 Dr. Charles Bamforth, Professor of Brewing at the University of California
 Thomas Berridge, Liberal MP from 1906 to 1910 for Warwick and Leamington (his father was a former headmaster)
 Prof Chris Berry, Professor of Political Theory from 1995 to 2011 at the University of Glasgow
 John Carleton, rugby union player
 Prebendary Tom Kerfoot OBE, founder and first General Secretary of the International Christian Maritime Association
 George Henry Evans Hopkins, entomologist
 Linder Sterling, photographer and performance artist
Prof Allan Matthews, Professor of Surface Engineering and Tribology at The University of Manchester, Director of the BP International Centre for Advanced Materials
 Canon Joseph Robinson, Canon of Canterbury and Master of the Temple 
 Peter Williams (English rugby player), rugby union

References

Buildings and structures in the Metropolitan Borough of Wigan
Education in the Metropolitan Borough of Wigan
Learning and Skills Beacons
Sixth form colleges in Greater Manchester
People educated at Upholland Grammar School
Educational institutions established in 1977
1977 establishments in England